Israfil Bek Jedygarov, or Israfil Bek Jedigar (1888 — 1939) was the Russian, Georgian and Polish military personnel of Azerbaijani origin.

Early life 
Israfil Bek Jedygarov (Yadigarov in Azerbaijani) was born on 7 August 1888 in Tbilisi. His father is Hasan-bek Yadigarov (1854-1934), a Major General of the Russian Army and a large landowner of the Borchaly Uyezd and grandfather is a participant in the suppression of the Hungarian Revolution of 1848, the Crimean War and the Russo-Turkish War of 1877-1878, Lieutenant General of the Russian Army Israfil-bek Yadigarov (1815-1885).

Education and service 
Israfil Bek was educated in the Tiflis Cadet Corps (1898-1905) and in the general classes of His Imperial Majesty's Page Corps (1905-1908). He received a military education in special classes of the same corps (1908-1910; graduated in the 1st category).

Israfil Bek entered military service with the rank of Page on September 1, 1908. One year later he was Kammer-Page (1909). He was promoted to Cornet (1910) in the 17th Nizhny Novgorod Dragoon Regiment, stationed in Tbilisi, and served in this regiment until 1917.

World War I 
During the World War I, he participated in battles on the North-Western Front (near the cities of Warsaw and Łódź, on the rivers Bzura and Warta) as part of the 17th Nizhny Novgorod Dragoon Regiment. Regularly commanded advanced and intelligence patrols. On October 1, 1914, he was wounded in the right leg in the battle near the Sochaczew-Błonie highway. After recovery, he returned in December 1914 to the same regiment, transferred in December 1914 from Warsaw to the Caucasus Front. Participated in battles on the Caucasus Front: in the Persian campaign against the Turks and Kurds (May-June 1915), in the Alashkert defensive operation against the Turks (June-July 1915), etc. Since 1916, he had the rank of Shtabs-rotmister.

In Georgia 
After the proclamation of the Democratic Republic of Georgia, Israfil Bek joined the Georgian army. He participated in the Armeno-Georgian War in December 1918.

Israfil Bek is on the list of candidates for deputies to the Constituent Assembly of Georgia from the Group of Muslims from Borchalo District. But his candidacy was not registered by the Georgian authorities, along with such names as Abdurrahim bey Hagverdiyev and Omar Faig Nemanzade.

During the Soviet invasion of Georgia in February-March 1921, he commanded a Muslim rebel detachment of 200 people who fought against the Bolsheviks and the Red Army. He left for Turkey after the Soviet occupation of Georgia.

In Poland 

In November 1922, he relocated from Turkey to Poland and entered the service in the Polish Army (Wojsko Polskie in Polish). As a citizen and resident of Georgia, as well as a former Major of the Georgian army, he was on the list of Georgians, not Azerbaijanis. His colleagues were Arczil Bek Jedygarov, Veli Bek Jedigar, Kakutsa Cholokashvili, Roman Gvelesiani, Spiridon Chavchavadze, Dzangir Kazim-bek, Israfil Muhammed-bey and others. Here he completed retraining courses for officers and completed an internship in the 7th cavalry detachment in Mińsk Mazowiecki, after which he served in the cavalry units of the Polish Army with the rank of Rotmistr (certified by the last rank in the Russian army), then Major and Podpułkownik of the 11th Legions Uhlan Regiment in Ciechanów.

Israfil Bek Jedigar died in 1939. He was buried at the Muslim Tatar cemetery in Warsaw.

Honours 

  Order of St. Vladimir 4th class, 21 January 1915
  Order of St. Anne 4th class, 15 April 1915
  Order of St. Stanislaus 3rd class, 23 June 1915
  Order of St. Anne 3rd class, 11 September 1915
  Order of St. Stanislaus 2nd class, 16 May 1916

References

See also 

 Veli bey Yadigarov
 Islam in Poland

1888 births
1939 deaths
People from Tbilisi
People from Tiflis Governorate
Azerbaijani anti-communists
Azerbaijani military personnel of World War I
Russian military personnel of World War I
Military personnel from Georgia (country)
Polish Army officers